Anthony Joseph Mahoney (born 29 September 1959) is an English retired professional footballer who played in the Football League for Fulham, Brentford and Crystal Palace as a forward. He later forged a career in non-League football and played a decade with Canvey Island.

Club career

Fulham 
Mahoney began his career as a trainee with Second Division club Fulham. Aged just 17 years and 38 days, he made his professional debut in a league match versus Cardiff City on 6 November 1976 and became the-then second-youngest Fulham debutant. Out of favour at Fulham, Mahoney joined Fourth Division club Northampton Town on loan in October 1981 and made six league appearances without scoring. Mahoney failed to break through to the first team at Craven Cottage was released in 1982. He made 69 appearances and scored 13 goals during six seasons as a first team player with the club.

Brentford 
Mahoney joined Third Division club Brentford on a three-month trial in July 1982. Partnering Francis Joseph up front, Mahoney had a good start to life at Griffin Park, scoring 15 goals in his first 28 appearances and signing a permanent contract, before suffering a fractured leg in an FA Cup second round replay versus Swindon Town in December. After recovering, he failed to show the same kind of form and was released at the end of the 1983–84 season. Mahoney made 58 appearances and scored 19 goals during his two years with Brentford.

Crystal Palace 
Mahoney joined Second Division club Crystal Palace in June 1984. In a one-season stay at Selhurst Park, he made 24 appearances and scored five goals.

Non-League football 
Mahoney dropped into non-League football to sign for Isthmian League First Division club Grays Athletic in July 1985. He was part of the team which secured promotion to the Premier Division and won two cups during the 1987–88 season, with Mahoney's striker partnership with Micky Welch being regarded as the most-feared in non-League football. Mahoney transferred to Southern League Premier Division club Dartford in 1988 and then to Essex Senior League club Canvey Island in 1989. He was a part of a golden era for Canvey Island, which saw the club rise from the Essex Senior League to the Isthmian League First Division with three promotions in three seasons. Mahoney was also part of the Canvey Island team which went on a run to the first round proper of the 1995–96 FA Cup, when they took Second Division club Brighton & Hove Albion to a replay before going out.

International career 
Mahoney represented England Youth at international level.

Personal life 
Mahoney married his wife Michele on Saturday 21 February 1981 in Grays and together with best man Kevin Lock, he played for Fulham later that day. Mahoney's son, Tony Jr, was fatally stabbed in September 1999.

Career statistics

Honours 
Grays Athletic
Isthmian League First Division: 1987–88
 Essex Senior Cup: 1987–88
 Essex Thameside Trophy: 1987–88

Canvey Island
 Essex Senior League: 1992–93
 Isthmian League First Division: 1998–99
 Isthmian League Second Division: 1995–96, 1997–98
 Essex Senior Cup: 1998–99

References

1959 births
Footballers from Barking, London
English footballers
Brentford F.C. players
English Football League players
Fulham F.C. players
Isthmian League players
Northampton Town F.C. players
Association football forwards
Crystal Palace F.C. players
Grays Athletic F.C. players
Dartford F.C. players
Southern Football League players
Living people
Canvey Island F.C. players
People with multiple sclerosis
England youth international footballers